Sungdare Sherpa born in 1956 in Thame village, Solukhumbu, Nepal was a Nepalese Sherpa guide for climbers of Mount Everest, who summited Everest on five different climbs. He was the first person to summit Mount Everest three times.

Climbing career
Sungdare was with Hannelore Schmatz when she died on a 1979 expedition. He remained with her after she died, and as a result, lost most of his fingers and toes to frostbite.

Despite losing his digits, Sungdare summitted Mount Everest four more times after the 1979 expedition.

Death
Sungdare drowned in a river below his village, Pangboche, Nepal in 1989.

Elizabeth Hawley stated that he had alcoholism and that his death was a suicide. He was survived by his widow, Bhingfuti.

As quoted in an article in Backpacker magazine talking about Mount Everest:

Ascents of Everest
1979
1981 October summiting
1982 October summiting
1985
1988

See also
List of Mount Everest summiters by number of times to the summit
List of Mount Everest guides
List of 20th-century summiters of Mount Everest

References

Further reading
The Backpacker - May 1986 (Google Books link)

Year of birth missing
1989 suicides
Nepalese mountain climbers
Nepalese people with disabilities
Sherpa summiters of Mount Everest
Suicides by drowning
Suicides in Nepal
Nepalese Buddhists
People from Solukhumbu District
Nepalese female mountain climbers